Numao is a Hmongic language of China.

Varieties
Meng (2001) lists the following language varieties for Numao.

Numao 努茂 (Nu Mhou,) - 1,715 speakers in Libo County, Guizhou; representative dialect: Yaolu Township, Libo County 荔波瑶麓瑶族乡
Numao 努茂 (Nu Mhou, White-Trouser Yao 白裤瑶,) - about 1,200 speakers in the townships of Yaolu 瑶麓 and Jiarong 佳荣
Dongmeng 冬孟 (Long-Shirt Yao 长衫瑶,) - about 400 speakers in the townships of Maolan 茂兰, Dongtang, 洞塘, and Weng'ang 翁昂

Zhou (2013:29) lists the following three varieties of Numao and also provides 400-word vocabulary lists for them.

White-Trouser Yao 白裤瑶 (autonym: təu51 m̥o33) in Yaoshan Township 瑶山乡
Green Yao 青瑶 (autonym: mu51 m̥ɑu33) in Yaolu Township 瑶麓乡
Long-Shirt Yao 长衫瑶 (autonym: tən33 m̥o55) in Yaozhai 瑶寨, Dongtang Township 洞塘乡

The Guizhou Province Gazetteer (2002) lists the following autonyms for these villages in Libo County, Guizhou.
: Yaolu 瑶麓
: Yaoshan 瑶山
: Yao'ai 瑶埃

References

West Hmongic languages
Languages of China